Ahmed Ali Mohamed (born 23 October 1990) is a Somali footballer who currently plays for  side Halesowen Town, where he plays as a midfielder. Ali also captains the Somalia national team.

Early life
Ali was born in Somalia and lived since age five in Reeuwijk, where he grew up.

Club career
Ali made his debut in 2010, for Alphense Boys. The next year, he moved to CVV De Jodan Boys, where he combined football with his law studies.

Ali moved to England with his family in 2013, after his contract with Jodan Boys was dissolved. From October 2015 to February 2016, he played for Sheffield FC. He then played for Bromsgrove Sporting FC, which he exchanged for Redditch United FC in November 2016. In January 2017 he returned to Bromsgrove Sporting.  In January 2018 he returned to the field at Bromsgrove Sporting. After the coach's resignation, Ali went to Halesowen Town FC in March 2018. In October 2018 Ali returned to Redditch United. In January 2019 he moved to Qatar. On 20 December 2019,  Ahmed rejoined Southern League Division One Central side Halesowen Town. Ali made his second debut on 21 December 2019 in a home Southern League Division One Central fixture against Aylesbury United, and had a debut to remember scoring a brace in a 4–1 victory for Halesowen Town.

International career
On 22 November 2012, Ali made his debut for the Somalia national team in a friendly match against Ugandan club SC Villa. Three days later, he played his first international match at the 2012 CECAFA Cup in a 1–5 loss to Burundi. He also played in that tournament against Sudan and Tanzania. On 5 September 2019, he captained the side in a 1–0 win against Zimbabwe, marking Somalia's first ever FIFA World Cup qualification victory.

Personal life
His brother Mohamud Ali also plays for the national team.

References

External links

1990 births
Living people
Association football midfielders
Somalian footballers
Somalia international footballers
Northern Premier League players
Northwich Victoria F.C. players
Sheffield F.C. players
Bromsgrove Sporting F.C. players
Redditch United F.C. players
Halesowen Town F.C. players
Somalian expatriate footballers
Somalian expatriate sportspeople in England
Expatriate footballers in England
Somalian emigrants to the Netherlands
People with acquired Dutch citizenship
Dutch footballers
People from Reeuwijk
Alphense Boys players
ADO Den Haag players
CVV de Jodan Boys players
Rijnsburgse Boys players
Dutch expatriate footballers
Dutch expatriate sportspeople in England
Expatriate footballers in Qatar
Somalian expatriates in Qatar
Footballers from South Holland